The men's decathlon event at the 2016 African Championships in Athletics was held on 22 and 23 June in Kings Park Stadium.

Results

References

2016 African Championships in Athletics
Combined events at the African Championships in Athletics